Megoulianitika or Magoulianitika was an old neighbourhood in the city of Patras, Achaea, Greece.

References
 Ν.Ι. Λυμπέρη, Οδηγός Πατρών, 4η έκδοση, Πάτρα 2005, p. 48 (in Greek)
 Κώστας Ν. Τριανταφύλλου, Ιστορικόν Λεξικόν των Πατρών, Τόμος B', Τυπογραφείο Πέτρου Χρ. Κούλη, Πάτρα 1995, Τρίτη Έκδοση, λήμμα "Μαγουλιανίτικα" (in Greek)

Neighborhoods in Patras